David Burke (born June 18, 1967) is an American television actor. He attended the College of William and Mary where his most famous role was that of Eugene Morris Jerome in Brighton Beach Memoirs and as Arthur in The Tick (2001-2002).

Career
Burke has appeared on many television shows in guest roles. Among the series in which he has appeared are: Law & Order, Frasier, Mr. & Mrs. Smith, Holding the Baby, Star Trek: Voyager, Malcolm in the Middle, Ghost Whisperer, Judging Amy, and Grey's Anatomy.

His recurring or starring credits include:

Brothers & Sisters as Jack Bishop
Joan of Arcadia as Father Ken Mallory
The Tick as Arthur
The Invisible Man as Kevin Fawkes
The Crew as Paul Steadman
Party of Five as Bill

References

External links

American male television actors
Male actors from New Jersey
College of William & Mary alumni
Living people
1967 births